The president of the Democratic Party is one of the leaders of the Democratic Party, the main centre-left political party in Italy. The current president is Valentina Cuppi, who was appointed on 22 February 2020.

List of presidents

Presidents timeline

List of vice presidents

References